Coleshill may refer to:

England
 Coleshill, Warwickshire, a town
 Coleshill, Buckinghamshire, a village and civil parish
 Coleshill, Oxfordshire, a village and civil parish (formerly Berkshire)
nearby Coleshill House, destroyed "best Jonesian mid C17 house in England".

Wales
 Coleshill, Flintshire, a historic administrative subdivision of Flintshire

See also
 Cole's Hill, an historical landmark in Plymouth, Massachusetts, US
 Coal Hill (disambiguation)